Tsafiki, also known as Tsachila or Colorado, is a Barbacoan language spoken in Ecuador by c. 2000 ethnic Tsáchila people.

Phonology

Consonants 

 /b, d/ are preglottalized [ˀb, ˀd] when occurring intervocalically.
 /k/ can become voiced  when intervocally after nasal sounds.
 /ɹ/ is heard as  when occurring word-initially, and when following a nasalized vowel, an allophone [n] occurs.
 /s/ is heard as  when preceding high vowels /i, u/ and after unaccented high vowels.
 /t͡s/ is heard as  when preceding high vowels, but many speakers pronounce it as [t͡ʃ] in all environments.

Vowels 
Tsafiki has five vowels Four vowels have nasalized forms.

 Unaccented vowels before voiceless stops are often devoiced [ḁ].

References

External links
Colorado (Intercontinental Dictionary Series)

Languages of Ecuador
Endangered Barbacoan languages
Barbacoan languages